{{Infobox television
| image                = Baladaporunamor.jpg
| caption              = Daniela Romo & Alfredo Adame
| num_episodes         = 140
| genre                = Telenovela
| creator              = María Zarattini
| writer               = María Zarattini
| starring             = Daniela RomoAlfredo AdameJorge RiveroEnrique LizaldeLeticia PerdigónIsaura EspinozaClaudio Brook
| opentheme            = Balada por un amor by Daniela RomoQuiero amanecer con alguien by Daniela Romo
| endtheme             =
| theme_music_composer = Juan LopezBebu Silvetti
| language             = Spanish
| country              = Mexico
| runtime              = 21–22 minutes
| company              = Televisa
| location             = 
| channel              = Canal de las Estrellas
| audio_format         = 
| picture_format       = 
| first_aired          = 
| last_aired           = 
| executive_producer   = José Rendón
| producer             = 
| director             = José RendónJavier Díaz DueñasKarina Duprez
| cinematography       = Jorge Miguel Valdés
| editor               = 
| related              = 

Balada por un amor (English title: Ballad for a love) is a Mexican telenovela produced by José Rendón for Televisa in 1989.

Daniela Romo, Alfredo Adame and Jorge Rivero starred as protagonists, while Isaura Espinoza and Leticia Perdigón starred as antagonists. Enrique Lizalde starred as special performance.

Plot 
The story is about the singer Brianda (Daniela Romo), the girlfriend of Gustavo (Alfredo Adame). On a trip Brianda's plane suffers an accident and falls into the sea. She runs to a forest where she meets Manuel Santa María (Jorge Rivero) who flees from thugs. Brianda and Manuel fall in love until he discovers that he is her father. Brianda is slowly discovering that who she really loves is Gustavo.

Cast 
 Daniela Romo as Brianda Portugal Mercader
 Alfredo Adame as Gustavo Elenes Salamanca
 Jorge Rivero as Manuel Santamaría
 Enrique Lizalde as Fernando Portugal
 Leticia Perdigón as Lucía Allende
 Isaura Espinoza as Lidia Mercader
 Claudio Brook as Marcelo Allende
 Daniela Castro as Simona Portugal
 Meche Barba as Adela
 Javier Díaz Dueñas as Sebastián
 Margarita Gralia as Virginia
 Magda Guzmán as Beatriz
 Nelly Horsman as Pachita
 Arsenio Campos as Eloy Allende
 Irma Lozano as Leonora Mercader
 Miguel Macía as Benjamín Allende
 Yolanda Mérida as Ángela Pérez
 María Teresa Rivas as Victoria
 Rafael Banquells Jr. as Agustín
 Héctor Cruz Lara as Bruno Sagasta
 Alicia Fahr as Eloísa Negrete
 Jorge Pais as Octavio Elenes
 Darío T. Pie as Pablo Negrete
 José Gálvez as Tony Vargas

Awards

References

External links 
 

1989 telenovelas
Mexican telenovelas
1989 Mexican television series debuts
1990 Mexican television series endings
Spanish-language telenovelas
Television shows set in Mexico
Televisa telenovelas